The Arlberg Railway, which connects the Austrian cities Innsbruck and Bludenz, is Austria's only east-west mountain railway. It is one of the highest standard gauge railways in Europe and the second highest in Austria, after the Brenner. The 135.7 km line is a highly problematic mountain railway, in part because it is threatened by avalanches, mudslides, rockfalls and floods. It is operated by the Austrian Federal Railways (ÖBB) and frequented by international trains, including the Orient Express.

History and construction 

As early as 1842 a railway over the Arlberg Pass was under discussion, as the British sought a rail connection for traffic from England to Egypt.  Two years later, in 1847, Carl Ganahl - a textile industrialist from Feldkirch - decided to privately support construction of the railway, despite the many technical challenges involved. On the other hand, the opening of the Semmering Railway in 1854 showed that mountain railways were basically possible and feasible. Trade Minister Anton Freiherr von Banhans presented on March 22, 1872, at the Chamber of Deputies a draft law on the execution of the Arlberg railway at government expense for a total amount of 42 million florins. In 1879 the protagonists of the Arlbergbahn with the intended 10,270 m long summit tunnel were successful. The submitted project had won confidence by the progress in the Gotthard Tunnel. Julius Lott was appointed planning director of the Arlbergbahn.

The construction of the Arlberg Railway started on June 20, 1880, and proceeded at a faster pace than planned. Completion was originally not expected until the autumn of 1885, but already by May 29, 1883, the valley route from Innsbruck to Landeck in Tyrol was put into service. The construction claimed 92 lives. The costs were totaled 38,165,282 crowns. The Arlberg tunnel rises from St. Anton on a length of approximately 4 km with 2 ‰. The highest point is at 1310.926 m in kilometer 104.241 m. Then it falls to Langen am Arlberg at 15 ‰.

Operation 
The transalpine Arlberg Railway opened up a completely new connection between Lake Constance and the Adriatic Sea.  Traffic increased so rapidly that already by July 15, 1885, a second track through the tunnel was opened, as had been planned since the beginning of the project. The most renowned train on the Arlberg route was the Orient Express, from London to Bucharest, which had only first-class compartments and parlors.

Right from the beginning, the use of steam locomotives on the Arlberg led to serious problems: Passengers and crews were exposed to the unhealthy effects of sulfurous acid, which condensed from the steam in the tunnel.  Grade slopes of up to 3.1% on the western ramp and 2.6% on the eastern ramp caused traction troubles for the locomotives. Finally, in 1924, this problem was eliminated with the completion of electrification of the tunnel, followed by the ramp sections in 1925.  This electrification of the railway was carried out with a 15 kV, 16.7 Hertz system, allowing heavy trains to be pulled over the route once the tracks and supporting structures, including the Trisanna bridge in 1964, had been upgraded for the increased axle weights.

Today, traffic through the Arlberg railway tunnel has increased considerably, despite competition from road transport through the Arlberg Road Tunnel. This has made it necessary to widen the approach ramps for double tracks.  Many long-distance, high-speed EuroCity and Railjet  trains ply the route from Vienna to Vorarlberg over the Arlberg.  On the occasion of the World Ski Championships in 2001, the railway station of St. Anton on the eastern side of the Arlberg Tunnel was relocated from the town centre to a new site on the north side of the valley. This required the Arlberg tunnel be lengthened and the construction of the new Wolfsgruben tunnel.

Beginning with 2020, the stretch of track between Landeck-Zams and Ötztal will be selectively double-tracked, to increase capacity and improve the frequency of local services. The program, which was announced in 2018, will likely be completed by 2025, and was chosen over the more expensive full double-tracking plans. The first works are scheduled to take place between 19 and 21 September 2020, during which services will be disrupted.

Locomotives

Steam locomotives
From the universal locomotive, kkStB Class 73 with an operating weight of 55.1 tons, 436 pieces were ordered. Thanks to its capacity of 700 PS they could transport on the level 1,650 tons at 30 km/h, on a slope of 10 ‰ a weight of 580 t at 15 km/h and on a slope of 25 ‰ 220 t, also at 15 km/h. They were mainly used for freight traffic.

See also 

Landeck-Zams railway station
Arlberg

References

Railway lines in Austria
Transport in Tyrol (state)
Transport in Vorarlberg
Imst District
Innsbruck-Land District
1883 establishments in Austria